The sixth season of the American animated comedy television series Archer premiered in the United States on FX on January 8, 2015. The season concluded on April 2, 2015, consisting of 13 episodes.

Production 
In March 2014, FX ordered a sixth season, consisting of 13 episodes.

In October 2014, creator Adam Reed confirmed that the spy agency would no longer be known as "ISIS" due to the acronym's association with the jihadist group Islamic State of Iraq and Syria.

The season premiered on January 8, 2015.

Shortly after episode 2 aired, a viewer notice that a serial number featured on computer screen in the episode was actually hexadecimal ASCII code for a website URL. This URL was the first step in an extensive interactive online "scavenger hunt" which animator Mark Paterson had devised as a side project to the season, which was awarded the Primetime Emmy Award for Outstanding Interactive Program for 2015.

Episodes

Home media

References

External links 
 
 

2015 American television seasons
Archer (2009 TV series) seasons